NOPA, the Norwegian Society of Composers and Lyricists is a society for creators of music and song lyrics in Norway. The object of the society is to promote Norwegian creative music, musical works and lyrics and other texts in musical works, strengthen professional cooperation, create meeting places and work for the members’ artistic and financial interests

It was created in 1937 as Norske populærautorer. The name has later been changed to NOPA – Norsk forening for komponister og tekstforfattere. It is a daughter organization of TONO, and a sister of the Norwegian Society of Composers. Chief administrative officer is Tine Tangestuen, while the board of directors consists of Ole Henrik Antonsen (Chair), Kate Havnevik (Vice chair), Samsaya Sampda Sharma (Vice chair), Thea Hjelmeland, Torgny Amdam, Anne Judith Stokke Wik, Kjetil Bjerkestrand.
NOPA is currently one of the 36 organizations of composers and songwriters represented by the European Composer and Songwriter Alliance.

References

Organisations based in Oslo
Organizations established in 1937
Norwegian writers' organisations
Norwegian culture
Norwaco
1937 establishments in Norway